The Saigon–Lộc Ninh railway is an obsolete railway, connecting from Ho Chi Minh City to Lộc Ninh. Built from the French colonial period, connecting with the North–South railway at Dĩ An station, passing Thủ Dầu Một in Bình Dương Province and then on An Lộc and Lộc Ninh. This route was abandoned during the Vietnam War.  At present, there is a plan to restore and rebuild this road to connect 128.5 km of Trans-Asian Railway to Cambodia.

References 

Railway lines in Vietnam